John Baker (by 1503 – 21 January 1544), of Presteigne, Radnorshire was a Welsh politician.

He was the son of John Baker of Presteigne.

He was appointed High Sheriff of Radnorshire for 1540–1541 and elected a Member (MP) of the Parliament of England for Radnorshire in 1542. He also served as a deputy lieutenant and custos rotulorum for the county.

He married Catherine, the daughter of John Bradshaw of Ludlow, Shropshire and had at least 1 son.

References

 

1544 deaths
16th-century Welsh politicians
People from Presteigne
English MPs 1542–1544
Year of birth uncertain
High Sheriffs of Radnorshire
Deputy Lieutenants of Radnorshire
Members of the Parliament of England (pre-1707) for constituencies in Wales